Leishmanolysin-like (metallopeptidase M8 family) is a protein that in humans is encoded by the LMLN gene.

Function 

This gene encodes a zinc-metallopeptidase. The encoded protein may play a role in cell migration and invasion. Studies of a similar protein in Drosophila indicate a potential role in mitotic progression. Alternatively spliced transcript variants have been described. [provided by RefSeq, Feb 2009].

References

Further reading 

 
 

Human proteins